A  is a Japanese government organization established under the Cabinet Office, ministries or their external organs (commission and agencies) when particularly necessary. It is distinguished from a facility. The amendments, in particular, made it clear that the National Police Agency is an extraordinary organ attached to the National Public Safety Commission, which is an external organ of the Cabinet Office.

Examples 
 Cabinet Office
 Office for the Promotion of Overcoming Population Decline and Vitalizing Local Economy in Japan
 Secretariat of Intellectual Property Strategy Headquarters
 Office of National Space Policy
 Northern Territories Affairs Administration
 Child and Child-rearing Administration
 National Ocean Policy Secretariat
 Financial Crisis Response Council
 Council for the Promotion of Private Finance Initiatives
 Headquarters for Promotion of Development and Support for Children and Young People
 Council on Measures to Cope with Society with Declining Birthrate
 Aging Society Policy Council
 Central Traffic Safety Policy Council
 Council for the Promotion of Policies for Crime Victims
 Council for Combating Childhood Poverty
 Consumer Policy Council
 International Peace Cooperation Headquarters
 Science Council of Japan
 Center for Personnel Interchanges between the Government and Private Entities
 Atomic Energy Location Council
 National Public Safety Commission
 National Police Agency
 Ministry of Internal Affairs and Communications
 Central Election Management Council
 National Committee for the Management of Political Fund
 Ministry of Justice
 Public Prosecutors Office (Supreme Public Prosecutors Office, High Public Prosecutors Offices, District Public Prosecutors Offices, Local Public Prosecutors Offices)
 Ministry of Foreign Affairs
 Overseas Diplomatic Establishments (Embassies, Consulates, Permanent Missions)
 National Tax Agency
 National Tax Tribunal
 Ministry of Education, Culture, Sports, Science and Technology
 Japan Academy
 Headquarters for Earthquake Research Promotion
 Japanese National Commission for UNESCO
 Agency for Cultural Affairs
 Japan Art Academy
 Ministry of Health, Labour and Welfare
 Council for Policy of Suicide Prevention
 Central Council for Countermeasures for the Unemployed Who Left the U.S. Forces in Japan
 Ministry of Agriculture, Forestry and Fisheries
 Agriculture, Forestry and Fisheries Research Council
 Council for the Promotion of Dietary Education
 Fisheries Agency
 Pacific Ocean Wide Sea-area Fisheries Adjustment Commission
 Sea-of-Japan / Kyushu West Wide Sea-area Fisheries Adjustment Commission
 Seto Inland Sea Wide Sea-area Fisheries Adjustment Commission
 Ministry of Land, Infrastructure, Transport and Tourism
 Geospatial Information Authority of Japan
 Ogasawara General Office
 Bicycle Utilization Promotion Headquarters
 Japan Marine Accident Tribunal
 Ministry of the Environment
 Conference on Environmental Pollution Control
 Ministry of Defense
 Defense Council
 Staff Office
 Joint Staff Office
 Ground Staff Office
 Maritime Staff Office
 Air Staff Office
 Units and Organizations of the Japan Self-Defense Forces
 Japan Ground Self-Defense Force
 Japan Maritime Self-Defense Force
 Japan Air Self-Defense Force
 Cooperative Units
 Cooperative Organizations
 Defense Intelligence Headquarters
 Inspector General's Office of Legal Compliance
 Foreign Military Supply Tribunal (established temporarily)
 Conference on Promotion concerning Realignment of U.S. Forces in Japan

References 

Extraordinary organs (Japan)
Government agencies of Japan